The R560 road is a regional road in Ireland. It is a road on the Dingle Peninsula in County Kerry. The road forms part of the Wild Atlantic Way.

The R560 travels southwest from the N86 near Camp via Connor Pass between the Brandon and central Dingle mountain groups. From here, the road descends to end at Dingle.

References

Regional roads in the Republic of Ireland
Roads in County Kerry